Rhophodon problematica is a species of small air-breathing land snail, a terrestrial pulmonate gastropod mollusk in the family Charopidae. This species is endemic to Australia.

References

Gastropods of Australia
Rhophodon
Gastropods described in 1947
Taxonomy articles created by Polbot